Utahime 4: My Eggs Benedict (歌姫4 -My Eggs Benedict-) is the cover album by Japanese singer Akina Nakamori. It was released on 10 January 2015 under the Universal Music Japan. It's Nakamori's eighth cover album. It's also Nakamori's first album to be published after hiatus for first time in 6 years.

This is the final album being produced by producer Yuuji Toriyama.

It's officially considered as fourth album to the Utahime cover series. The album consist of the pop songs, which were released in Japan during 1990s and 2000s.

The album was released in regular and first-press edition. The limited edition includes recording footage of the album. Both of the album jackets were taken with film camera by Nakamori herself.

Chart performance
Utahime 4: My Eggs Benedict debuted at number 5 on the Oricon Album Weekly Chart, charted for 11 weeks and sold over 26,500 copies.。

Track listing

References

2015 albums
Japanese-language albums
Akina Nakamori albums
Universal Music Japan albums